Alan Glen (born 21 December 1951) is a British blues harmonica player, best known for his work with The Yardbirds, Nine Below Zero, Little Axe, and his own bands, The Barcodes and The Incredible Blues Puppies.

Career
Glen started playing harmonica after seeing Muddy Waters, and the 'American Folk-Blues Festivals' which visited London in the late 1960s and early 1970s. His early influences being Little Walter, Sonny Boy Williamson, and Junior Wells. Early bands he was involved with were Crowjane Bluesband, The Radical Sheiks and Brothers Grimm, before going on to join Nine Below Zero (1991–1995), and The Yardbirds(1996–2003 and 2008–2009).

Glen has played on over 50 albums and recorded/performed with: Alannah Myles, Jeff Beck, Steve Vai, Slash, (on the Yardbirds' album Birdland) John Mayall, Steve Lukather, Skunk Baxter, Lee 'Scratch' Perry, Horace Andy, Junior Delgado, Bernie Marsden, Paul Jones, Papa George, Geoff Everett, Gary Fletcher, Gordon Smith, Micky Moody, he has recorded eight albums with Little Axe. In addition he appeared alongside Alan Barnes, Jim Mullen and Roger Cotton on the With Friends Like These album for the Barcodes, which also included Zoot Money. He played with Peter Green, Mick Taylor and Hubert Sumlin at the Long Beach Blues Festival.

He recorded the album On The Road Again with Dr. Feelgood. Other collaborators include Art Themen, Pee Wee Ellis, Dub Syndicate, Paul Cox, Archive (band), Alan Barnes, Little Axe and Gypie Mayo. Glen has played at Montreux, Brecon Jazz Festival and Nice Jazz Festivals, Hollywood House of Blues, the Hilton, Las Vegas, Sporting Lisbon Stadium, Wembley Arena, Ronnie Scott's Club and The Royal Albert Hall, as well as various television and radio performances.

Tours

Nine Below Zero - 1993 - Spain,Portugal & Scandinavia (with Sting)
 
Nine Below Zero - 1993 - USA (with Alvin Lee)

Nine Below Zero - 1994 - USA & Canada (with Alannah Myles)

Nine Below Zero - 1994 - 12 Nights at the Royal Albert Hall with Eric Clapton)

Nine Below Zero - 1994 - UK tour (supporting The Kinks)

Nine Below Zero -  1994 - UK tour (supporting Brian May)

Little Axe - 1996 - European tour 

The Yardbirds - 1996 - Australia tour 

The Yardbirds - 1998 - USA & Canada

The Yardbirds - 2000 - USA & Canada
  
The Yardbirds - 2001 - European Tour

The Yardbirds - 2003 - 'Birdland' tour - USA & Canada

The Yardbirds - 2008 - European tour

Soundcheck magazine referred to Glen as "one of the finest blues harp players and slide guitarists of his generation," and also received praise from Net Rhythms for his harmonica playing.

Glen's original music was used on the soundtrack of the BB King Biopic "Life of Riley"

Selected discography

The Yardbirds -
Birdland (Favored Nations) - 2003
Nine Below Zero –
Off the Hook (China Records) - 1992
Hot Music for a Cold Night (I.R.S. Records) - 1994
Best of Nine Below Zero (I.R.S. Records) - 1994
"Ice Station Zebro" (Pangea Records ) - 1995 
"'Live' in Europe 1992" (Floating World Records ) - 2011
Dr. Feelgood –
On the Road Again (Grand Records) - 1994
Little Axe –
Slow Fuse - (M&G Records) - 1996
Hard Grind - (Fat Possum Records) - 2002
Champagne and Grits - (Real World Records) - 2004
"Stone Cold Ohio"  ( Real World Records ) - 2006
Bought for a Dollar, Sold for a Dime" - (Real World Records) - 2010
"If You Want Loyalty, Buy a Dog" (On-U Sounds) - 2011
"Wanted Live" (LA Records) - 2012
London Blues (On-U Sounds) - 2018
Junior Delgado –
Reasons (Big Cat Records) - 1999
Dub Syndicate –
Acres of Space (Lion & Roots) - 2001
Rasta Far I (Collision Cause Chap) - 2006
The Barcodes -
Keep your Distance (Note Records) - 2000
Independently Blue (Note Records) - 2004
With Friends Like These (Note Records) - 2006
Live - In Session for the BBC (Note Records) - 2007
"Be Cool - The Best of The Barcodes" ( Note Records ) - 2011
Incredible Blues Puppies -
Puppy Fat (Note Records) - 2005
In The Doghouse (Note Records) - 2008
Roger Cotton and Alan Glen -
Born in Black & White (Note Records) - 2003
Gordon Smith -
"The Essential Gordon Smith" ( Note Records ) - 2009
"Gordon Smith - Live" (Brooks Blues) - 2011
The Geoff Everett Band
 The Quick And The Dead - 2012
Tim Hain & Alan Glen
' GlenHain Gold Reserve (Note Records) - 2012
Steve Morrison & Alan Glen
 Blues from South of the River - 2012
Robin Bibi & Alan Glen
Live at The Oval Tavern (2016)
St Lawrence Blues (2019)
 Dave Peabody Trio
Flea Biting Blues (2019) 
Eldon Backhouse & Electric Blues Band
'Catslide Roof (2019)
Lee 'Scratch" Perry -
"Heavy Rain" (On-U Sounds) - 2020
Gary Fletcher Band -
"River Keeps Flowing" (Repertoire Records) - 2020
Bernie Marsden -
"Chess" (Conquest Records) - 2021

See also
List of harmonicists

References

External links
Barcodes website
Note Records website

1951 births
Living people
Musicians from Wuppertal
Blues harmonica players
Harmonica blues musicians
I.R.S. Records artists
Fat Possum Records artists